Ruel Vance Churchill (12 December 1899, Akron, Indiana – 31 October 1987, Ann Arbor, Michigan) was an American mathematician known for writing three widely used textbooks on applied mathematics.

In 1922 Churchill received his undergraduate degree from the University of Chicago. In 1929 he received his PhD from the University of Michigan under George Rainich with thesis On the Geometry of the Riemann Tensor. He spent his entire career as a member of the U. of Michigan mathematics faculty and retired in 1965 as professor emeritus. His doctoral students include Earl D. Rainville.

Books
Complex Variables and Applications, McGraw-Hill, 1st edition 1948, 2nd edition 1960, The 3rd (1974) and later editions were co-authored with James Ward Brown
Fourier Series and Boundary Value Problems, McGraw-Hill, 1941, 2nd edition 1963
Modern Operational Mathematics in Engineering, McGraw-Hill, 1944
Operational Mathematics, McGraw-Hill, 1958, 2nd edition of the 1944 book but with a new title, 3rd edition 1972

Selected articles

with R. C. F. Bartels: 
with C. L. Dolph:

References

External links

1899 births
1987 deaths
20th-century American mathematicians
University of Chicago alumni
University of Michigan alumni
University of Michigan faculty
People from Indiana
American textbook writers